Candelo is a town in south-eastern New South Wales, Australia. In 2011, Candelo had a population of 732 people. Candelo was named by Peter Imlay, the first European settler in the area, who named his original 1834 house "Candelo House" after the town of Candelo, Italy.

The area around Candelo was first settled by Europeans in the 1830s, and the village was developed in the 1860s at a crossroads, following the passage of the New South Wales Land Act of 1861 which allowed closer settlement.

Candelo hosts notable community events such as the Candelo Village Festival, a biennial music and arts festival.  The inaugural festival was held in 2008. The Candelo Show, held every January is an annual agricultural and horticultural exhibition event that has been running since 1883. The Candelo Markets are held on the first Sunday of the month and have been running since 1982. They exist primarily to fund community projects in the Candelo area. These markets are notably a dog free zone, however, it is widely known by many tourists to turn a blind eye to the local bureaucracy and insist in bringing their hounds.

Sapphire Speedway is located within the Candelo locality. The track is 600m and features a Clay/Granite mix. Among the divisions that run at the track are RSA Limited Sedans, SSA Production Sedans, Junior Sedans and Dirt Karts.

References

Towns in New South Wales
Towns in the South Coast (New South Wales)
1860s establishments in Australia
Bega Valley Shire